Gary Onik (born February 25, 1952, in Brooklyn, New York City) is a medical doctor and inventor.  He is known for ultrasound-guided procedures for treating cancer using cryosurgery.

Inventions
Gary Onik is the inventor of ultrasound-guided cryosurgery procedures for the prostate and for the liver.

Onik treated the first liver patients with cryosurgery in 1986 and the first patient with ultrasound-guided prostate cancer cryosurgery in 1990. He developed techniques and instrumentation that have been integral to the minimally invasive treatment of cancer.

References

1952 births
Living people
20th-century American inventors
American surgeons
Harvard Medical School people
Harvard University alumni
New York Medical College alumni
University of California, San Francisco alumni